Malcolm Smith may refer to:

Malcolm Smith (artist) (1910–1966), American retro-futurist artist
Malcolm Smith (cricketer) (1932–2012), South African cricketer
Malcolm Smith (motorcyclist) (born 1941), American off-road racer
Malcolm Smith (sailor) (born 1959), Bermudian sailor
Malcolm Smith (American politician) (born 1956), New York State Senator and former Senate Majority Leader
Malcolm Smith (British politician) (1856–1935), Liberal Member of Parliament for Orkney and Shetland, 1921–1922
Malcolm Arthur Smith (1875–1958), zoologist, herpetologist, and physician
Malcolm Bruce Smith (1924–2000), Australian chemist
Malcolm Kela Smith, (1943−2021), British-born Australian politician and businessman, governor of Eastern Highlands Province in Papua New Guinea (2002–2012)
Malcolm Smith (climber) (born 1973), Scottish rock climber
Malcolm Smith (Australian footballer) (born 1958), played for St. Kilda
Malcolm Smith (American football) (born 1989), American football player
Malcolm Smith (footballer, born 1953), English former professional footballer
Malcolm Smith (footballer, born 1970), English former professional footballer
Malcolm C. Smith, Professor of Control Engineering at the University of Cambridge

See also
Malcolm Smyth, Irish chemist